Budha Theh is a census town in Amritsar district  in the state of Punjab, India.

Demographics
 India census, Budha Theh had a population of 8,730. Males constitute 56% of the population and females 44%. Budha Theh has an average literacy rate of 72%, higher than the national average of 59.5%; with male literacy of 79% and female literacy of 63%. 12% of the population is under 6 years of age.

References

Cities and towns in Amritsar district